The Pragmatic Entente: Israeli–Iranian Relations, 1948–1988 is the first comprehensive work on the history of long-standing yet ever-changing relationship between Israel and Iran. The book is written by Sohrab Sobhani, Iranian-American adjunct professor of International Relations at Georgetown University.

Content 
The author of this book, Sohrab Sobhani, has used the first-hand experiences and reports of people who were involved in the relations between Israel and Iran, before and after the arrival of Ruhollah Khomeini in Tehran in 1979. In this book, the relationship between Israel and Iran is studied in the complex background of Middle East politics. The author interviews many former Iranian officials and reveals a wealth of new information that explains why Iran and Israel act the way they do and why their interests have been intertwined for the past forty years. The book examines the main trends in the emergence of relations between the two countries of Israel and Iran and introduces the factors leading to continuity or change in these relations. In this book, by analyzing the historical events of the past, there is a discussion about how the relations between Israel and Iran will be in the future. By examining the reasons, the author shows that the Tehran-Tel Aviv connection will continue to be one of the stable features of the power configuration in the Middle East.

The book begins with a discussion of the origins of Israel-Iran relations, which were initially formed to help Iraqi Jews move to Israel. The author goes on to discuss how Iran's religious rightist have used the issue of Iran's recognition of Israel as a political tactic against the central government. Later chapters delve deeper into the Israeli–Iranian alliance against radical Arab governments, including subjects such as supporting Kurdish rebels inside Iraq and the necessity of the Arab-Israeli war in 1973. The book also introduces Britain's withdrawal from the Persian Gulf as Israel and Iran's plan to develop missiles capable of carrying nuclear warheads.

Critique 

In the book "The Pragmatic Entente: Israeli–Iranian Relations, 1948–1988", by examining the historical events related to the dealings of the Zionists with the Pahlavi II (Shah of Iran) after the occupation of Palestine, by putting contradictory and conflicting materials together, an attempt has been made to instill the fact that the governments of Iran and Israel should always remain allies of each other, and based on this, the existence of strong and extensive relations between them is an inevitable necessity that will protect the national interests of both sides. This is despite the fact that the contents of this book were written based on the interests of the Zionists. The contents of this book support the creation of a reliable global capitalist base by Israel in the heart of the Islamic world and the Middle East, which requires Tehran's connection with Tel Aviv. This book aims to resolve the legitimacy crisis of the Zionist regime and justify the unjust occupation of Palestine by Israel.

This book is written in support of more presence of Israelis and their wider participation and the advancement of their intelligence activities in Iran and the Middle East. This book has legitimized the Zionist activities against Islamic and Arab countries.

This book depicts Iran's cooperation with Israel as planned by England and then America, not based on reality. The fact that Iran's cooperation with Israel led to SAVAK's gaining power in Iran and had no result for the Iranian nation other than more suffocation, has been ignored in this book. The contents presented in this book represent a very small part of the events of that era.

The contents of this book make it clear that the interests of the relationship between Iran and Israel have mainly served to strengthen and maintain the authoritarian Pahlavi regime, not for the welfare and development of the Iranian nation. Israel's profit-seeking relations with Iran, including Israel's abuse of Iran's vast financial and oil facilities, are understated in this book.

In the text of the book, the author tried to create a false enemy for the Iranian nation and tried to show the non-Shiite countries neighboring Iran and the Arab countries and the Soviet Union as Iran's enemies and to present the alliance with Israel as the way to free Iran from their clutches, which somehow it is unreal. Israel's relation with Iran during the time of Pahlavi II did not bring Iran the benefits mentioned in the book.

In this book, an attempt has been made to prove the existence of connections between Iran after the revolution and Israel, despite all the contradictions of speech, if it is repeatedly stated in the text of the book, "The biggest danger for Israel is Khomeini's threats". By making some baseless claims, the principles of Iran's Islamic Revolution, which include defending the rights of the Palestinian nation and opposing the Zionist racists, have been questioned.

One of the contradictory things mentioned in the book is that the Zionists have been Iran's defender against the American sanctions. This is in the case that not only have the Zionists never been considered an obstacle for the American sanctions against Iran, but they have always wanted it to be more severe. The restriction of Iranian Jews to travel abroad and the existence of tacit cooperation between Iran and Israel in the context of the Islamic Revolution are also among other completely baseless claims of this book that do not correspond to reality.

The contradictory contents and directed judgments, the lack of proper coherence in the content presented, and the lack of a strong writing method are among the other weaknesses of this work.

The book is written based on invalidated hypotheses. The book is written more based on speculation than the first-hand research that the author claims.

Release 
The book was published for the first time in 1989 in English language under the title "The Pragmatic Entente: Israeli–Iranian Relations, 1948–1988" by "Praeger" publications in New York City, United States of America. This book was translated into Persian and published in 1998 by the "Ketab Corp" publishing located in Los Angeles.

See also 
 Not for the Faint of Heart: Lessons in Courage, Power and Persistence
 Manufactured Crisis: The Untold Story of the Iran Nuclear Scare
 Foucault in Iran: Islamic Revolution after the Enlightenment
 Iran Between Two Revolutions
 Zero Days
 War on Peace
 National Security and Nuclear Diplomacy
 On the Road to Kandahar

References

External links 
 Review of "The Pragmatic Entente Israeli–Iranian Relations, 1948–1988" on JSTOR
 The Pragmatic Entente Israeli–Iranian Relations, 1948–1988 – Foreign Affairs
 The Pragmatic Entente Israeli–Iranian Relations, 1948–1988, by Sohrab Sobhani. Review of Middle East Studies – Cambridge Core

Books about international relations
American books
Iran–Israel relations
1989 books
English-language books